The general speed limits in Albania are as follows:

 within built-up areas;
 outside built-up areas;
 on expressways;
 on freeways.

Special restrictions
Speed limits for certain vehicles are as follows:
Mopeds: .
Vehicles transporting dangerous goods:
 within built-up areas;
 outside built-up areas.
Agricultural machinery:
 without pneumatic tires;
 within built-up areas;
 outside built-up areas.
Trams:
 within built-up areas;
 outside built-up areas.
Vehicles with trailers (excluding cars):
 within built-up areas;
 outside built-up areas;
 on freeways.
Buses exceeding :
 within built-up areas;
 outside built-up areas;
 on freeways.
Merchandise transport vehicles weighing :
 outside built-up areas;
 on freeways.
Merchandise transport vehicles exceeding :
 outside built-up areas;
 on freeways.
Trucks transporting passengers exceeding :
 outside built-up areas;
 on freeways.
Transport and loading vehicle while loaded
 within built-up areas;
 outside built-up areas;

References
 Kodiak Rigorous i Republics st Shqipërisë (in Albanian).

Albania
Law of Albania
Road transport in Albania